Women's Slalom World Cup 1983/1984

Calendar

Final point standings

In Women's Slalom World Cup 1983/84 the best 5 results count.

References
 fis-ski.com

World Cup
FIS Alpine Ski World Cup slalom women's discipline titles